Galeries de Granby is a regional shopping mall in Granby, Quebec, Canada. It opened in 1974 and was enlarged in 1980 and 2001.

Anchor tenants
IGA
Walmart

References

External links
Official website 

Buildings and structures in Granby, Quebec
Shopping malls in Quebec
Shopping malls established in 1974
1974 establishments in Quebec
Tourist attractions in Montérégie